The Massachusetts Education Reform Act (MERA) of 1993 was an act of legislation passed in Massachusetts that  "greatly increased the state's role in [a] funding public education and in [b] guiding the local education process." Over a 7-year period, MERA mandated several modern educational reforms, among them: the introduction of charter schools and the use of the MCAS standardized test. MERA is based on Outcomes Based Education.

Notes

References 
Driscoll, L., Berger, J.B., Hambleton, R.K., Keller, L.A., Maloy, R.W., Hart, D.,...Churchill, A. (2005). Education reform: Ten years after the Massachusetts Education Reform Act of 1993. Nonpartisan Education Review, 1(2). Retrieved from https://www.nonpartisaneducation.org/Review/Resources/ed.connection.2003.pdf

Education reform
Public education in Massachusetts
Massachusetts statutes
Reform in the United States
1993 in Massachusetts
1993 in education
1993 in American law
United States education law